Constancia del Rosario  is a town and municipality in Oaxaca in south-western Mexico. The municipality covers an area of  298.54 km². 
It is part of Putla District in the west of the Sierra Sur Region.

As of 2005, the municipality had a total population of 3796.

References

Municipalities of Oaxaca